John Tripp (born May 4, 1977) is a Canadian-born German professional ice hockey coach and former player. He served as head coach at Braehead Clan until March 2018.

Tripp played 43 games in the National Hockey League for the New York Rangers and the Los Angeles Kings, before continuing his career in Germany.

Playing career
Tripp was originally drafted by the Colorado Avalanche in the third round, 77th overall, in the 1995 NHL Entry Draft. He re-entered the draft two years later and was drafted by the Calgary Flames in the second round, 42nd overall. Despite being drafted by two different teams, both times fairly high in the draft selection, he would not see NHL level playing time until the 2002–03 season when he played nine games for the New York Rangers. The next season, 2003–04, Tripp played 34 games for the Los Angeles Kings.

In 2004, during the NHL lockout, Tripp moved to the Deutsche Eishockey Liga in Germany for Adler Mannheim. In 2006, he moved to ERC Ingolstadt before heading to the Hamburg Freezers in 2007. In this time Tripp was able to obtain German citizenship and represent Germany internationally.

After three seasons with the Freezers, Tripp left and signed an initial try-out contract with fellow German based club, the Hannover Scorpions on September 22, 2010. After three weeks John was released by the Scorpions but immediately signed a one-year contract for the remainder of the 2010–11 season with Kölner Haie on October 19, 2010. He then remained with the Haie team through the 2014-15 season, serving as team captain between 2011 and 2015.

Tripp played 11 seasons in the top flight DEL, before signing a one-year contract with second tier based, Eispiraten Crimmitschau of the DEL2 on September 8, 2015.

International play
Tripp won 110 caps for the German national team between 2006 and 2014, scoring 28 goals and assisting on 15 more. He played in the 2010 Olympic Games in Vancouver and six World Championships, helping Germany to a semifinal appearance in 2010, the team's greatest success since winning bronze at the 1976 Olympics.

Coaching career 
On December 27, 2016, he accepted his first head coaching job at Eispiraten Crimmitschau of the German DEL2. His team had to go into the relegation round, where they overcame Rosenheim which allowed the Crimmitschau club to remain in the league. Tripp and the team parted ways after the conclusion of the 2016-17 season.

In May 2017, Tripp agreed a deal to become the new head coach of Braehead Clan in the UK's EIHL. He guided the Clan to a ninth-place finish in the regular season, his tenure ended in late March 2018. Tripp returned to his native Canada and started the Kingston Hockey Academy.

Media career 
Since January 2016, Tripp has been serving as co-host and analyst of CHL Centre Ice, a show dedicated to the Champions Hockey League (CHL), and as color commentator of CHL games. He was a member of the TSN broadcast crew at the 2017 IIHF World Championships.

Personal life 
He has been friends since his childhood with Jayna Hefford; both went to the same school.

Tripp's maternal grandparents immigrated from Germany to Canada in 1953. His nickname is Hans, after his German grandfather. Tripp is married to Taryn Turnbull, a former basketball player at Tulane University and in the German second division. His brother-in-law, Stuart Turnbull, played professional basketball in Germany.

A cancer survivor himself, he founded Tripp Charity to raise money and awareness for children battling cancer.

Career statistics

Regular season and playoffs

International

References

External links
 

1977 births
Adler Mannheim players
Calgary Flames draft picks
Canadian ice hockey right wingers
Colorado Avalanche draft picks
ERC Ingolstadt players
ETC Crimmitschau players
German ice hockey players
Hamburg Freezers players
Hannover Scorpions players
Hartford Wolf Pack players
Hershey Bears players
Houston Aeros (1994–2013) players
Ice hockey people from Ontario
Sportspeople from Kingston, Ontario
Ice hockey players at the 2010 Winter Olympics
Johnstown Chiefs players
Kölner Haie players
Living people
Los Angeles Kings players
Manchester Monarchs (AHL) players
Milwaukee Admirals (IHL) players
New York Rangers players
Olympic ice hockey players of Germany
Oshawa Generals players
Pensacola Ice Pilots players
Saint John Flames players
German ice hockey coaches
Canadian ice hockey coaches
Canadian expatriate ice hockey players in Germany
Canadian expatriate ice hockey players in the United States